The Ruki is a river in the Democratic Republic of the Congo. It is a left tributary of the Congo River. It may be seen as the lower reach of the Busira River, which in turn may be seen as the lower reach of the Tshuapa River.

Location

The Ruki is a major river in the Cuvette Centrale of the middle Congo River basin.
The drainage basin is almost entirely pristine lowland forest and swamp forest.
As of 2020, 248 species of fish had been identified in 26 families.
The main rivers are the Ruki-Busira, Momboyo-Luilaka, Tshuapa, Lomela and Salonga.

The Ruki River forms above Ingende where the Momboyo River joins the Busira River from the left and flows in a west-northwest direction.
It enters the Congo from the east, flowing past the north of the town of Mbandaka.
High water is in March-April and November.
Low water is in February and June-July. 

Higher up it is called the Busira as far as the confluence of the Tshuapa and the Lomela.

Colonial period

The explorer Henry Morton Stanley visited the region, and called the Ruki the Mohindu River.
A local man from Bungata named the river Buruki (Ruki) or Mohindu, meaning "Black".

The African Queen

The Ruki River was used as a location for the movie The African Queen starring Humphrey Bogart and Katharine Hepburn.
A 1951 article in Life magazine describes how the influx of filmmakers broke the "sweltering monotony of life along the dank, disease-ridden shores" of the river.
Forest was cleared to create a "cluster of tasteful native huts".
Filming took seven weeks.

Notes

Sources

Rivers of the Democratic Republic of the Congo